TheBrain Technologies is a software company located in Los Angeles, California. Founded in 1998, they specialize in a Knowledge Graph type of mind mapping software.

Products
Their flagship product, TheBrain, has been popular in mind mapping circles, and runs on multiple operating systems. Their other major product, BrainEKP, received an award from the James Burke institute in 2008. Their other products include TeamBrain, TeamBrain Server and a mobile application for iOS and Android.

References

Website 

Software companies based in California
Companies established in 1998
Software companies of the United States